Nicolas-Hubert Mongault (6 October 1674 – 11 August 1746, Paris) was a French ecclesiastic and translator of the classics.  He was an illegitimate son of Gilbert Colbert, Marquis de Saint-Pouange, a cousin of Louis XIV's powerful minister Jean-Baptiste Colbert.

External links
Académie française

1674 births
1746 deaths
Writers from Paris
17th-century French writers
17th-century French male writers
18th-century French writers
18th-century French male writers
Members of the Académie Française